The 2014–15 Greek Basket League was the 75th season of the Greek Basket League, the highest tier professional basketball league in Greece.

The season started on October 12, 2014 and ended June 14, 2015. Olympiacos won the title, after they beat Panathinaikos 3–0 in the Finals. The season ended on June 17, when PAOK won the third-place series over Aris.

Teams

Regular season

Standings

Results

Playoffs 
Teams in bold won the playoff series. Numbers to the left of each team indicate the team's original playoff seeding. Numbers to the right indicate the score of each playoff game.

Bracket

Final league standings

Awards

See also
2014–15 Greek Basketball Cup
2014–15 Greek A2 Basket League (2nd tier)

References

External links 
 Official Basket League Site 
 Official Basket League Site 
 Official Hellenic Basketball Federation Site 

Greek Basket League seasons
1
Greek